Harfouch is a surname. Notable people with the surname include:

 Corinna Harfouch (born 1954), German actress
 Omar Harfouch (born 1969), Lebanese entrepreneur
 Walid Harfouch (born 1971), international television manager, producer, and public figure

See also
Harfush clan, Lebanon